Mitsuhashi Takajo or Takajo Mitsuhashi (三橋 鷹女; born Fumiko Matsuhashi (三橋 たか) near Narita, Chiba on 24 January 1899; died 7 April 1972) was a haiku poet of the Shōwa period.

Biography 
Mitsuhashi Takajo was born near Narita. She was an admirer of Akiko Yosano and her father wrote tanka. In 1922 she married Kenzō (東 謙三), a dentist who wrote haiku and that influenced her to switch to haiku herself. By 1936 she became part of a group that founded the short-lived Kon (dark blue) publication and in 1940 had the collection Himawari or Sunflowers published. The war proved difficult for her family and in 1953 she became involved in a progressive magazine of avant-garde poets who allowed experimental haiku. Her last collection, in 1970, dealt somewhat with death as she had been ill for years.

Legacy and image 
She has been referred to as a religious ascetic or one who led a life of asceticism and spiritual concentration. She is said to have written works of self-alienation and the Void. A statue of her is at Shinshoji Temple.

She is also placed as one of the "4 Ts" of Japanese female haiku poets. The other three are Tatsuko Hoshino, Nakamura Teijo, and Hashimoto Takako.

References 

Japanese women poets
Writers from Chiba Prefecture
1899 births
1972 deaths
20th-century Japanese poets
20th-century Japanese women writers
Japanese haiku poets